Tormented refers to someone that has been subjected to a torment, such as the tormento della corda.

It may also refer to:

Films
Tormented (1960 film), a thriller film directed by Bert I. Gordon
Tormented (2009 British film), a British horror comedy film
Tormented (2009 Salvadorean film), a computer animated short film
Tormented (2011 film), a Japanese horror film

Albums
Tormented (Abscess album)
Tormented (Staind album)